Traci Dinwiddie is an American film and television actress.

Biography
Dinwiddie was born in Anchorage, Alaska, of Syrian and Cherokee descent. She made her debut in 1998 movie Target Earth. She has appeared in films including Summer Catch (2001), Black Knight (2001), The Notebook (2004), End of the Spear (2006), Mr. Brooks (2007), Elena Undone (2010), Raven's Touch (2015), and Stuff (2015). She has also appeared on the TV shows One Tree Hill for one episode, Dawson's Creek for two episodes and has appeared in Supernatural for 6 episodes.

Filmography

Film

Television

References

External links

20th-century American actresses
21st-century American actresses
American people of Cherokee descent
American people of Syrian descent
American film actresses
American television actresses
American voice actresses
Living people
Actresses from Anchorage, Alaska
Year of birth missing (living people)